William Malone Polglase (June 20, 1924 – March 8, 1973) was an American television and radio personality who worked for WMAL/WMAL-TV in Washington D.C. and was the first host of Supermarket Sweep.

Early life
Malone was born on June 20, 1924 in Brooklyn. He graduated from Brooklyn Preparatory School, where he played football, baseball, and hockey. He attended the College of the Holy Cross for one year before leaving in 1942 to join the United States Navy as a Cadet in the Naval Service Training Command. After his active duty ended, Malone remained in the United States Navy Reserve as a jet pilot.

Broadcasting career

Radio
At the end of World War II, Malone resumed his education at Fordham University, where majored in business administration. He was a member of the school’s football team, but quit after his freshman year. He then worked at the school’s radio station as a football play-by-play announcer and staff announcer. After graduating, Malone joined WAVE in Louisville, Kentucky. After six months, Malone left for WMAL, where he worked as an evening DJ and quiz show host. From 1953 to 1954, he was the color commentator for the Washington Redskins radio/television simulcasts. In 1957 he succeeded Jim Gibbons as WMAL’s morning host.

Television
Malone was the longtime evening sports anchor WMAL-TV. He also hosted a number of programs for the station, including Heavyweight Wrestling, Bandstand Matinee Club, Town & Country Matinee, and Ladies' Home Theater, as well as special events, such as the Cherry Blossom Festival and the President's Cup Regatta. From 1965 to 1967, Malone hosted Supermarket Sweep.

On March 8, 1973, Malone died in a car accident outside New York City.

References

1924 births
1973 deaths
Brooklyn Preparatory School alumni
Road incident deaths in New York City
Fordham University alumni
People from Brooklyn
Professional wrestling announcers
Radio personalities from Washington, D.C.
United States Navy captains
United States Navy pilots of World War II
United States Navy reservists
Washington Redskins announcers